More Letters of Charles Darwin, a sequel to The Life and Letters of Charles Darwin of 1887, was a book in two volumes, published in 1903, edited by Francis Darwin and Albert Seward, containing as the title implies, additional publications of 782 letters from the correspondence of Charles Darwin.

The Times noted that "the two volumes of More Letters of Charles Darwin form a fitting supplement to The Life and Letters", which it had in turn described as "one of the best biographies ever written".  In the Darwin letters trilogy it was followed by Emma Darwin: A Century of Family Letters (1905/1915)

R. B. Freeman noted that it "contains almost entirely new matter although some extracts and a few whole letters are also found in Life and letters. It also contains a brief autobiographical piece (pp. 1-5) which is sometimes found in modern editions and translations of his main autobiography."

The book is dedicated "with affection and respect, to Joseph Hooker in remembrance of his lifelong friendship with Charles Darwin".

It contains a timeline of Darwin's life.

The Darwin Correspondence Project has further letters available, many published online.

List of correspondents

Letters to or from the following individuals were included in the publication:

A 
 Alexander Agassiz (American scientist)
 Hubert Airy
 Isaac Anderson-Henry
 David Thomas Ansted (geologist)
 Duke of Argyll

B 
 Francis Maitland Balfour
 Abraham Dee Bartlett
 H. W. Bates
 Thomas Belt
 George Bentham
 M.J. Berkeley
 Leonard Blomefield
 William Bowman
 Heinrich Georg Bronn
 T. Lauder Brunton
 Axel Gudbrand Blytt

C 
 Alphonse Louis Pierre Pyramus de Candolle
 Julius Viktor Carus
 Robert Chambers
 John Collier
 Edward Cresy
 Walter Drawbridge Crick
 James Croll

D 
 J.D. Dana
 Camille Dareste
 Caroline Darwin (sister)
 Emma Darwin (wife and cousin)
 Erasmus Alvey Darwin (brother)
 Robert Darwin (father)
 William Erasmus Darwin (eldest son)
 Federico Delpino
 Mary Catherine Stanley, Lady Derby
 Horace Dobell
 Frans Cornelis Donders

E
 Léo Abram Errera

F 
 Hugh Falconer
 Jean-Henri Fabre
 Thomas Farrer, 1st Baron Farrer (statistician, father by his first wife of Ida who married Darwin's son Horace, and whose second wife Katherine was Emma's niece, and hence also Darwin's first cousin once removed.)
 Frederic William Farrar
 Henry Fawcett
 W.H. Flower
 John Fiske
 Edward Forbes
 George Fraser

G 
 Francis Galton (statistician, half-cousin)
 A. Gapitche
 George Arthur Gaskell
 Albert Gaudry
 James Geikie
 Joseph Henry Gilbert
 Philip Henry Gosse
 Asa Gray
 William Rathbone Greg
 Sir Richard Gregory, 1st Baronet, as "The Editor of Nature"

H 
 Ernst Haeckel
 W.H. Harvey
 Alpheus Hyatt
 Oswald Heer
 J.S. Henslow
 Friedrich Hildebrand
 Luke Hindmarsh
 Karl Höchberg
 Leonard Horner
 Joseph Dalton Hooker
 William Jackson Hooker (son of Joseph Dalton Hooker)
 William Horsfall
 Frederick Hutton
 T.H. Huxley

J 
 G. Jäger
 J.W. Judd
 John Jenner Weir

K 
 Ernst Krause

L 
 James Lamont
 E. Ray Lankester
 G.H. Lewes
 John Lindley
 John Lubbock, 1st Baron Avebury
 Friedrich Ludwig
 Charles Lyell
 Katharine Murray Lyell (as "Mrs Lyell", Charles Lyell's sister-in-law)
 Mary Horner Lyell (wife of Charles Lyell)

M 
 Daniel Mackintosh
 Maxwell Masters
 David Milne-Hume
 Raphael Meldola
 Thomas Meehan
 John Traherne Moggridge
 Johann August Georg Edmund Mojsisovics von Mojsvar
 Alexander Goodman More
 Henry Nottidge Moseley
 William Hallowes Miller
 Fritz Müller
 Hermann Müller (German botanist)
 Max Müller
 Roderick Murchison
 George B. Murdoch
 John Morley

O 

 William Ogle
 Daniel Oliver
 Richard Owen (palaeontologist, opponent of the theory of evolution)

P 
James Paget
 Josef Popper
 Samuel Tolver Preston
 Joseph Prestwich
 Lyon Playfair, 1st Baron Playfair

Q 
 Jean Louis Armand de Quatrefages de Bréau

R 
 Thomas Mellard Reade
 Anthony Rich
 George Rolleston
 G.J. Romanes
 John Forbes Royle
 Charles Valentine Riley
 Thomas Rivers

S 
 John Burdon-Sanderson
 Louis Charles Joseph Gaston de Saporta, Comte de Saporta
 Karl Semper
 John Scott
 Hermann Gustav Settegast
 William Sharpey
 James Shaw
 Sydney Barber Josiah Skertchly
 Herbert Spencer
 Edward Sylvester Morse

T 
 Lawson Tait
 William Chester Tait 
 Emily Talbot
 William Bernhard Tegetmeier
 W.T. Thiselton Dyer
 G.H.K. Thwaites
 James Torbitt
 Daniel Hack Tuke
 Sir William Turner

V 
 Hermann Vöchting (German botanist)

W 
 Josiah Wedgwood II (maternal uncle)
 August Weismann
 Julius Wiesner
 Alfred Russel Wallace
 H.M. Wallis
 Benjamin Dann Walsh
 R. G. Whiteman 
 Alexander Stephen Wilson 
 Charles Henry Lardner Woodd
 Samuel Pickworth Woodward
 Francis Buchanan White
 Chauncey Wright

Z 
 Otto Zacharias (German zoologist)

Notes

References

External links 
 Darwin Correspondence Project
 Vol 1
 Vol 2

1903 books
Works by Charles Darwin
Correspondences